The Teresianum, officially the Pontifical Theological Faculty and Pontifical Institute of Spirituality Teresianum, is a pontifical faculty in Rome. It was established by the Discalced Carmelites for the study of scientific theology and anthropology.

History

The faculty was established on 16 July 1935 by Albert William (1878-1947), Father General of the Discalced Carmelite order after several years trying to convince the order that the institution should be established.

During World War II, the activities of the Faculty ceased but were restarted with renewed interest after the war. The renewed interest meant the original headquarters of the Faculty became too small and the institute secured a move to the Villa Pamphili in 1954. The new hall was equipped with more spacious rooms and an extensive library.

References

External links 

 

 
Carmelite educational institutions
Education in Rome
1935 establishments in Italy